Robert Bruce McCullough (13 June 1943 – 22 March 2020) was a New Zealand cricketer. He played in one first-class match for Wellington in the 1971/72 season.

References

1943 births
2020 deaths
New Zealand cricketers
Wellington cricketers
Place of birth missing
People from Waipawa
Sportspeople from the Hawke's Bay Region